During the 1993–94 English football season, West Ham United F.C. competed in the FA Premier League.

Season summary
West Ham United made a solid return to the top flight a year after being relegated, as they overcame the sale of captain Julian Dicks to Liverpool and achieved a 13th-place finish in the Premiership. Their form throughout the season was solid and they were never seriously threatened by relegation, and they even finished above their expensively-assembled local rivals Tottenham. The veteran striker-partnership of Trevor Morley and Lee Chapman scored goals at a decent rate and rarely showed much sign of their age (32 and 34 respectively). It was a solid season from a hard-working but unremarkable squad who defied the odds to keep clear of trouble without making a serious bid for honours.

Final league table

Results
West Ham United's score comes first

Legend

FA Premier League

FA Cup

League Cup

First-team squad
Squad at end of season

Left club during season

Transfers

Out
 Colin Foster – Notts County, loan
 Colin Foster – Watford, March
 Mark Robson – Charlton Athletic, November

References

West Ham United F.C. seasons
West Ham United
West Ham United
West Ham United